Leon Julius 'Jerry' Johnson (March 22, 1894 – October 24, 1947) is an American football running back who played two seasons in the National Football League with the Rock Island Independents and Racine Legion. He played college football at Morningside College.

References

External links
Just Sports Stats
Fanbase profile
rockislandindependents.com 

1894 births
1947 deaths
Players of American football from Iowa
American football running backs
Morningside Mustangs football players
Rock Island Independents players
Racine Legion players
People from Buena Vista County, Iowa